The olive straightbill (Timeliopsis fulvigula) is a species of bird in the family Meliphagidae.
It is found in the highlands of New Guinea.
Its natural habitat is subtropical or tropical moist montane forests.

References

olive straightbill
Birds of New Guinea
olive straightbill
Taxonomy articles created by Polbot